Parliamentary elections were held in Iceland on 30 June 1974. The Independence Party remained the largest party in the Lower House of the Althing, winning 17 of the 40 seats. They formed a coalition with the Progressive Party and Independence Party leader Geir Hallgrímsson was elected Prime Minister.

Background
Following the 1971 elections, a coalition government had been formed by the Progressive Party, People's Alliance and Union of Liberals and Leftists with the Progressives' Ólafur Jóhannesson as Prime Minister.

Early elections were triggered by the collapse of the coalition due to a petition to reconsider a policy that would close the United States naval base in Keflavik.

Results

References

Elections in Iceland
Iceland
Parliament
Parliamentary elections in Iceland
Iceland